Al-Nesoor Sports Club is a Sudanese football club based in Omdurman Capital. They play in the top division in Sudanese football, Sudan Premier League. Their home stadium is Khartoum Stadium.

National
Sudan Premier League
Champion (0):
Runners-up (0):
Third Place (0):
Fourth Place (0):
 8 Place (1):2011
 18 Place (1):2016
Sudan Cup
Champion (0):
Runners-up (0):
Semi-finals (0):
Quarter-Finals (1):2016
Round 16 (0):
Round 32 (0):
Preliminary Round (0):
Khartoum League
Champion (0):
Runners-up(0):

Current squad

References

External links
 Club logo
 Profile

Football clubs in Sudan